The women's qualification round at the 2011 European Artistic Gymnastics Championships was held on 6 April 2011.

Individual all-around

Vault

Uneven bars

Balance beam

Floor exercise

References 

European Artistic Gymnastics Championships
2011 in women's gymnastics